Derek Rodier (born 4 February 1959 in Edinburgh) is a Scottish former footballer who played for Hibernian, Dunfermline Athletic and Berwick Rangers.

External links 

1959 births
Living people
Hibernian F.C. players
Scottish footballers
Footballers from Edinburgh
Dunfermline Athletic F.C. players
Berwick Rangers F.C. players
Scottish Football League players
Association football fullbacks